Ian F. Mosley (born 16 June 1953, Paddington, London, England) is an English drummer. He is best known for his long-time membership of the neo-progressive rock band Marillion, which he joined for their second album, Fugazi, released in 1984. He had previously been an in-demand session drummer. Mosley's abilities have been widely praised, including by former Genesis guitarist Steve Hackett, Meshuggah drummer Tomas Haake and critic John Franck of AllMusic. Modern Drummer has characterised him as a "drumming great".

Biography

Early life
Mosley studied percussion at the Guildhall School of Music and Drama under teacher Gilbert Webster and, aged 18, played in the orchestra for the musical Hair. His first professional band was Darryl Way's Wolf. Mosley played drums for former Genesis guitarist Steve Hackett, both on two of his solo studio albums and on tour. He played for Gordon Giltrap. He also played on the 1975 album Birds by Dutch band Trace.

Marillion
Mosley joined Marillion in 1984 after a long search for a replacement for drummer and founding member Mick Pointer, who had left the band acrimoniously in 1983. He was the fifth drummer to play for Marillion and was frontman Fish's choice for the role, who had been unhappy with the band's previous drummers. Music critic John Franck stated Mosley's "spot-on drumming was the perfect foil for Marillion's meticulous musicianship". He is still a member of Marillion.

Other projects
In 2001, Mosley joined saxophonist Ben Castle, son of entertainer Roy Castle, and they recorded a jazz-themed album together, Postmankind. The album also featured guest performances by John Etheridge, Steve Hackett and Marillion members Steve Rothery and Pete Trewavas.

Mosley played on fellow Marillion bandmate Pete Trewavas' and Eric Blackwood's Edison's Children album In The Last Waking Moments..., playing drums on the epic 16 minute "The Awakening".

Musical style
Mosley's drumming skills have been praised by Steve Hackett, who has described him as "a phenomenal drummer" and "phenomenally fast". He has also said that Mosley's economy on the drums is "every bit the equal" to Phil Collins, Hackett's former Genesis bandmate.

Mosley has been cited as an influence by Tomas Haake, drummer of Swedish extreme metal band Meshuggah.

Mosley has stated that he enjoys "playing arrangements kind of in a classical format, which is in movements" but, despite his membership of several progressive rock bands over the course of his career, he does not believe in music labels and distances himself from the "progressive label" that "involves lyrics that quote dancing gnomes, Stonehenge and fairytales, etc."

Mosley's drumming is the subject of a book, A guide to the unique drumming style of Ian Mosley – Marillion's Heartbeat, written by drummer and Marillion fan, Mark Pardy.

In 2019, Mosley published his collected memoirs under the title Do I Owe You Money? – The Collected Memoirs of Ian Mosley.

References

External links

 
 Ian Mosley Career Retrospective Interview from 2016 with The Pods & Sods Network

1953 births
Living people
People from Paddington
British male drummers
English rock drummers
Marillion members
Alumni of the Guildhall School of Music and Drama